The 2020–21 Belgian Cup, called the Croky Cup for sponsorship reasons, was the 66th season of Belgium's annual football cup competition. The competition began on 2 August 2020 and ended with the final on 25 April 2021. The winners of the competition qualified for the 2021–22 UEFA Europa League play-off round.

Competition format
The competition consisted of one preliminary round, followed by ten proper rounds. All rounds were single-match elimination rounds, including the semi-finals which were traditionally held over two legs but not this season due to an extremely tight schedule. When tied after 90 minutes in the first three rounds, penalties were taken immediately. From round four, when tied after 90 minutes first an extra time period of 30 minutes was played, then penalties were taken if still necessary.

Teams entered the competition in different rounds, based upon their 2020–21 league affiliation. Teams from the fifth-level Belgian Division 3 or lower began in round 1, with the exception of four teams from the Luxembourg Belgian Provincial League which started in the preliminary round. Belgian Division 2 teams entered in round 2, Belgian National Division 1 teams entered in round 3, Belgian First Division B teams in round 5 and finally the Belgian First Division A teams entered in round 6.

Round and draw dates

Preliminary round
This round of matches was played on 23 August 2020 and included four teams playing in the Luxembourg Belgian Provincial League.

First round
This round of matches was played on 29 and 30 August 2020 and includes teams playing in the Belgian Division 3 and Belgian Provincial Leagues. Teams were divided into eight geographical groups and teams from the Belgian Division 3 were seeded and could not play each other. Note: Wetteren was promoted into the Belgian Division 2 after the draw was made to fill up a vacant spot but no redraw was made.

Second round
This round of matches was played on 5 and 6 September 2020 and includes the 111 winners from the First Round together with 49 teams playing in the Belgian Division 2. Teams from the Belgian Division 2 were seeded and could not play each other. Note: Mandel United was promoted into the Belgian National Division 1 after the draw was made to fill up a vacant spot but no redraw was made.

Third round
This round of matches was played from 11 till 15 September 2020 and included the 80 winners from the Second Round together with 16 teams playing in the Belgian National Division 1. Teams from the Belgian National Division 1 were seeded and could not play each other. The lowest team in the competition came from the third provincial division (8th level): FC Tilleur. 
Note: Lierse Kempenzonen was promoted into the Belgian First Division B after the draw was made to fill up a vacant spot but no redraw was made.

Fourth round
This round of matches was played on 20 September 2020 and includes the 48 winners from the Third Round. Lowest ranked teams still available were Blankenberge, Wielsbeke, Bilzerse Waltwilder and Vorselaar, all playing at the sixth level (First Provincial Division).

Fifth round
This round of matches was played on 10 and 11 October 2020 and includes the 24 winners from the Fourth Round together with the teams from the Belgian First Division B (with the exception of U23 team Club NXT which was ineligible, and Lierse Kempenzonen which already entered in the Third Round) and two teams from the Belgian First Division A, Oud-Heverlee Leuven and Waasland-Beveren. The lowest-ranked team still available was Blankenberge, all playing at the sixth level (First Provincial Division).

Sixth round
The draw for the sixth round was made on 12 October and included the teams from the Belgian First Division A, with the exception of Waasland-Beveren and OH Leuven which had entered in the prior round. The 16 teams entering at this stage were seeded and could not meet each other. Lowest teams still in the competition are RAAL La Louvière, Heur-Tongeren, Lokeren-Temse and Olsa Brakel, all from the Belgian Division 2 (tier 4).

As part of containment measures taken to limit to spread of the COVID-19 disease in the second half of October, amateur clubs were not allowed to organize group training sessions until mid-December, making it very difficult for these teams to prepare for the cup matches. Therefore, in November 2020 the matches were postponed from their initial dates (15, 16, and 17 December 2020) to 9 and 10 January 2021. Additionally, amateur clubs hosting matches without field-heating installations might lose their home advantage if weather conditions prove too challenging. With the containment measures in Belgium prolonged and amateur teams not allowed to play matches prior to 15 January unless adhering to the (expensive) professional sports protocols, an agreement was found in December with the amateur teams still in the cup to postpone all matches further, now from 9 and 10 January 2021 to the midweek of 2 to 4 February 2021. With no further postponements possible, in case further containment measures prevent the amateur teams from restarting on 15 January, these teams will be excluded from the competition, receiving some financial compensation in return. On 17 January, K.F.C. Dessel Sport forfeited their match, after the mayor of Dessel had not allowed Dessel Sport to follow the protocol of the professional football clubs, making it impossible for them to prepare for their cup tie with Beerschot. Beerschot immediately progressed to the next round. On January 19, for the same reasons, both Rupel Boom and Tessenderlo also forfeited their matches, respectively against Eupen and Genk. Eupen and Genk progressed automatically to the seventh round.

Seventh round
With the seventh round scheduled just one week after the sixth round, the draw was already made on 8 January 2021, before the previous round was even played. The lowest team still in the competition was Olympic Charleroi CF, the only non-professional team to make it this far.

Quarter-finals
The draw for the quarter-finals was made on 11 February 2021, right after the conclusion of the last match of the previous round, Union SG vs Anderlecht. Only teams from the top division were still present in the tournament.

Semi-finals
The draw for the semi-finals was made on 4 March 2021, right after the conclusion of the last match of the previous round, Standard Liège vs Club Brugge.

Final

Notes

References

Belgian Cup seasons
Belgian Cup
Cup